= Samaspura =

- village
- Location within Madhya Pradesh Location within India
- Coordinates: 23.114245°N 77.312325°E
- Country: India
- State: Madhya Pradesh
- District: Bhopal
- Tehsil: Huzur

Population (2011)
  - Total: 257
- Time zone: UTC+5:30 (IST)
- ISO 3166 code: MP-IN
- Census code: 482526

Samaspura is a village in the Bhopal district of Madhya Pradesh, India. It is located in the Huzur tehsil and the Phanda block.

== Demographics ==
According to the 2011 census of India, Samaspura has 50 households. The effective literacy rate (i.e. the literacy rate of population excluding children aged 6 and below) is 61.93%.

Demographics (2011 Census)
	Total	Male	Female
Population	257	131	126
Children aged below 6 years	39	19	20
Scheduled caste	3	2	1
Scheduled tribe	60	28	32
Literates	135	81	54
Workers (all)	83	66	17
Main workers (total)	40	33	7
Main workers: Cultivators	32	27	5
Main workers: Agricultural labourers	1	1	0
Main workers: Household industry workers	0	0	0
Main workers: Other	7	5	2
Marginal workers (total)	43	33	10
Marginal workers: Cultivators	1	1	0
Marginal workers: Agricultural labourers	41	31	10
Marginal workers: Household industry workers	0	0	0
Marginal workers: Others	1	1	0
Non-workers	174	65	109
